This bibliography of Donald Trump is a list of written and published works, by and about Donald Trump. Due to the sheer volume of books about Trump, the titles listed here are limited to non-fiction books about Trump or his presidency, published by notable authors and scholars. Tertiary sources (including textbooks and juvenile literature), satire, and self-published books are excluded.

Prior to his 2016 campaign, Trump was already the focus of many books describing his life as a businessman and politician. Biographer Michael D'Antonio observed in Never Enough: Donald Trump and the Pursuit of Success (2015) that Trump "has been a topic of conversation in America for almost 40 years. No one in the world of business – not Bill Gates, Steve Jobs or Warren Buffett – has been as famous as Trump for as long." Almost one year after his inauguration as president, The Guardian noted that more than 4,500 English-language books about Trump had been published since he took office, compared to just over 800 works about Trump's predecessor Barack Obama during his first year in office. This "Trump bump" for the U.S. publishing industry, as The New York Times put it, persisted throughout his time in office. But afterwards, demand for books about his presidency dropped off sharply.

Trump's first published book in 1987 was Trump: The Art of the Deal, written by ghostwriter Tony Schwartz. Trump made a practice of hiring ghostwriters and co-authors to write his books. In some cases the ghostwriters are credited on the cover, while in other instances, including Time to Get Tough (2011) and Crippled America (2015), Trump makes mention of the writer's contributions in the acknowledgements sections. Works written by Trump himself include self-help books, personal finance books, political policy treatises, and autobiographies. "...Schwartz has noted that, during the year and a half that they worked together on The Art of the Deal, he never saw a single book in Trump's office or apartment. Yet Trump has taken authorial credits on more than a dozen books to date, and, given that he’s a proven marketing master, it's inconceivable that he won’t try to sell more."

The Washington Post journalist Carlos Lozada observed that a continuous theme throughout Trump's written works is a focus on Trump himself, such as citing examples from his business in real estate investing and work on television. Parties and individuals discussed in books by Trump are reduced to a zero-sum game, according to Lozada: "Trump’s world is binary, divided into class acts and total losers." Trump often makes use of hyperbole to illustrate his points in his works. In other books, Trump repeats the same stories of what he views as key successes from his business career; for example, a tale about a 1980s business deal improving the Wollman Rink in Central Park, New York. Trump's published writings shifted post-2000, from generally memoirs about himself to books giving advice about finance.

Credited to Trump

About Trump

Books about the books about Trump

References

Further reading 

 
  Pulitzer Prize winning critic evaluates 150 recent books on Trump Administration.
 Zelizer, Julian E. ed. The Presidency of Donald J. Trump: A First Historical Assessment (2022) excerpt

External links
 
 
 Donald Trump on the Internet Archive
 
 "Donald Trump collected news and commentary" in The New York Times
 "Donald Trump collected news and commentary" in The Wall Street Journal

Bibliographies of people
Trump, Donald
Bibliography
Lists of books
Political bibliographies
 
Works about Donald Trump
Bibliography